Siwiec is a Polish surname. It may refer to:

 Marek Siwiec (born 1955), Polish politician and journalist
 Natalia Siwiec (born 1983), Polish glamour model
 Ryszard Siwiec (1909–1968), Polish anti-communist

See also
 

Polish-language surnames